Per-Ove Ludvigsen (born May 20, 1966) is a Norwegian former footballer. He played for SK Brann, after joining from local rivals Fyllingen Fotball after the latter club's relegation from the Norwegian Premier League in the 1993 season. In the 1990 season he won the first ever Kniksen award as a defender. He sent Brann to the cup final in 1999 with a goal in extra time in the semi-finals against Molde FK.  Ludvigsen was injured but had to play since Brann had used all its substitutes. He earned one cap for Norway in 1990.

After retiring in 2001, Ludvigsen was hired as Sport Director at SK Brann. With his few comments in the media, Ludvigsen presented many surprising transfers, many at the end of the transfer-window. Some of the players Ludvigsen is credited to have contracted are Thorstein Helstad, Bengt Sæternes, Paul Scharner, Eirik Bakke, Seyi Olofinjana and Martin Andresen. On November 2, 2006, Ludvigsen surprisingly quit his job at SK Brann, saying that he took his part of the responsibility for Brann's lowly finishes in the Premiership in both 2005 and 2006. In 2007 the team won the Norwegian league.

Ludvigsen worked as a football agent, but returned to SK Brann as a scout from the 2018 season. He is a brother of Inge Ludvigsen.

References

1966 births
Living people
Fyllingen Fotball players
SK Brann players
Kniksen Award winners
Norwegian footballers
Norwegian First Division players
Eliteserien players
SK Brann non-playing staff
Association football defenders
Association football forwards
Norway international footballers
Footballers from Bergen